Full Sail Brewing Company is a craft brewery in Hood River, Oregon, United States. Founded in 1987, Full Sail was the first commercially successful craft brewery to bottle beer in the Pacific Northwest for retail sale, and one of Oregon's early microbreweries.  The first beer packaged was Full Sail Golden Ale, followed in 1988 by Full Sail Imperial Porter, Full Sail Amber Ale, and Wassail Winter Ale.

History

The first year's total production of 287 barrels was brewed by four employees, followed by 2,200 barrels the next year. In 2007, Full Sail brewed more than 120,000 barrels. 

Based upon beer sales volume, Full Sail is the ninth largest craft brewery in the United States, the second largest craft brewer in Oregon, and the seventeenth largest brewery in the United States.

Full Sail became employee-owned in July 1999 through an employee stock ownership plan with the 47 employees. In March 2015, the employees voted to sell to Oregon Craft Brewers Co., an investment group formed by San Francisco-based private equity firm Encore Consumer Capital. Their rebranding was led by a Portland-based design and strategy firm called Sandstrom. 

In 2022, Full Sail brought on head brewmaster, formally the brewmaster at Old Town Brewing in Portland, Andrew Lamont.

Products and locations
In May 2005, Full Sail introduced Session Premium Lager, a tribute to pre-Prohibition beers and bottled in a stubby bottle. In 2007, Full Sail introduced a line of limited edition lager beers, called LTD#1 and LTD#2. LTD#3, a pilsner, debuted in May 2009. In July 2009 Full Sail added a new beer to their session line releasing Session Black Lager, also in the stubby 11 oz bottle.

The brewery is known for its quality microbrewed beers, most notably its trademark Amber Ale. Full Sail is located in the Columbia River Gorge in the city of Hood River, Oregon.  The Full Sail brewery, pub, and tasting room are all located at the same site in downtown Hood River.  Brewery tours are available daily, free of charge.  

In July 2003, Full Sail began contract brewing three beers for SABMiller under the almost 150-year-old Henry Weinhard's brand: Henry Weinhard's Hefeweizen, Northwest Trail Blonde Lager, and Amber Light.  SABMiller had purchased the brands from Stroh's in 1999, and for a few years had moved their production to its Tumwater, Washington brewery until it closed in 2003.

There is also a smaller Full Sail brewhouse in Portland, Oregon which serves as their research and development center and is where the small batch Brewmaster Reserve and Brewer's Share beers are concocted.

An arrival route into Portland International Airport, the TMBRS (Timbers) has successive waypoints named FFULL, SSAIL, MYCRO, BBREW, and PUBBB (Full Sail microbrew pub).

Awards
The Full Sail brewery has earned many honors for its beers, some of which include:
Twelve gold medals for Amber Ale at the World Beer Championships
Four gold medals and six silver medals for Pale Ale at the World Beer Championships
Five gold medals for India Pale Ale at the World Beer Championships
Three gold medals for LTD 01 at the World Beer Championships
Session Premier Lager named World's Best Premium Lager at the World Beer Awards
Session Black Lager was awarded a Gold Medal at the 2009 Great American Beer Festival
Session Black Lager was awarded a Gold Medal at the 2010 World Beer Cup

References

External links
 Full Sail Brewing Company official website

Employee-owned companies of the United States
Beer brewing companies based in Oregon
Columbia River Gorge
Companies based in Hood River, Oregon
1987 establishments in Oregon
American companies established in 1987 
Food and drink companies established in 1987